Rayong is a city (thesaban nakhon) on the east coast of the Gulf of Thailand and the capital of Rayong province. It covers tambons Tha Pradu and Pak Nam and parts of tambons Choeng Noen and Noen Phra, all within Mueang Rayong district. As of 2016 the population was 64,256 (est.). The main industry is fishing, and it is also the main producer of Thailand's fish sauce. It is also the center of the chemical and auto industries. In 2012 Ford Motor Company opened an assembly plant in Rayong to expand Ford's presence in the ASEAN area, employing some 2,200 people.

Rayong was named an Asia-Pacific City of the Future by the Financial Times in 2017.

Etymology 
Rayong comes from the Chong word for Pterocarpus macrocarpus, (commonly known as Burma Padauk, and in Thai “Pradu”) a tree that is common in the region.

History
During the late Ayutthaya period, when the former capital of Thailand was being destroyed by the invading Burmese, general Phaya Tak marched his troops to Rayong in order to build up his navy before proceeding on to Chanthaburi. He was later anointed "king" in Rayong. Phaya Tak later became King Taksin of the Kingdom of Thonburi, after which he returned to Ayutthaya, defeated the Burmese and set up a new capital in Thonburi.

Yomjinda Road bisects one of Rayong's oldest settlements. The road follows the Rayong River which, in the reign of King Rama VI, was the chief means of transport. The community rehabilitated the old town and today it has become a tourist destination.

People
 Sutthi Atchasai: (environmentalist fighting pollution at Map Ta Phut; died in 2014)

Gallery

Climate

References

External links

 The old market on Yomjinda Road
 Rayong
 ถนนยมจินดา ยมจินดา ธรรมดาซะที่ไหน (Yomjinda Road is not normal)
 ย่านเมืองเก่าระยอง ถนนยมจินดา Rayong's old town 

Populated places in Rayong province